Víctor Alba who also went as Pere Pagès i Elies (Barcelona, 1916 – Sant Pere de Ribes, 10 March 2003) was a Spanish anti-Stalinist communist politician, journalist, writer and Spanish university professor.

Career 
Alba began to study rights at a young age, beginning his studies at the University of Barcelona. He started his career as a political journalist at a young age. Affiliated with the Bloque Obrero y Campesino (Workers and Peasants' Bloc, BOC), he later worked for the Workers' Party of Marxist Unification (POUM) when the BOC combined with it. During the Spanish Civil War, he was the director of La Batalla, the organ of expression for the POUM. After the capture of the Basque region by Francoist forces in May 1937 he was arrested and jailed for six years in Valencia. After leaving prison, he went into exile in France, where he worked alongside Albert Camus, and in 1947 moved to Mexico, where he published various works. In Mexico he began a prolific literary production, in Spanish, French, Catalan and English, and became director of the Social Training center. In 1957, he moved north to the United States, working with various international groups and became a professor of the University of Kansas and in the Kent State University in Ohio. Initially identifying as a Marxist, he adopted social-democratic and anti-communist views during his exile.

In 1974 he retired from Kent State University, returning to Spain where he died in 2003.

Works
Alba wrote many works in various languages:

Els supervivents. Ed. Catalonia. México, DF, 1950. Novela sobre la Barcelona de posguerra. Reeditada en Barcelona, 1996.
Historia del comunismo en América Latina. Ed. Occidentales. México DF, 1953.
Mexicanos Para La Historia Biblioteca Minima Mexicana 1955
The Latin Americans. Praeger, Nueva York, 1969
Retorn a Catalunya. Portic, Barcelona, 1970.
Catalunya sense cap ni peus. Portic, Barcelona, 1971.
Homo sapiens catalanibus. Portic, Barcelona, 1974
USA, centre de la revolució mundial. Portic, Barcelona, 1974.
Catalonia. A Profile. Praeger, Nueva York, 1975
El pájaro africano. Planeta, Barcelona, 1975. Novela finalista del Premio Planeta de 1975.
El marxisme a Catalunya. 1919–1939. I-Historia del BOC. II-Historia del POUM. III-Andreu Nin. IV-Joaquim Maurín, Pòrtic, Barcelona, 1974–1975.
Els problemes del moviment obrer de Catalunya. Portic, Barcelona, 1976.
Historia de la resistencia antifranquista, 1939–1955. Planeta, Barcelona, 1978.
Todos somos herederos de Franco. Planeta, Barcelona, 1979
Sísifo y su tiempo. Laertes. Barcelona, 1996. Memorias.

References

External links

Victor Alba, Spanish Marxism vs Soviet Communism: A History of the P.O.U.M. in the Spanish Civil War
Victor Alba, Lessons of the Collectives
Victor Alba "La Revolución Española en la Práctica" (Introduction)
Víctor Alba works
Ignacio Iglesias In memoriam de Pere Pagès (Víctor Alba) (Spanish)
https://web.archive.org/web/20070927225858/http://www.march.es/ceacs/biblioteca/proyectos/linz/Herramientas/PDF/personajes.pdf 

1916 births
2003 deaths
Kent State University faculty
20th-century Spanish writers
20th-century Spanish male writers
University of Kansas faculty
POUM politicians
20th-century Spanish journalists
Historians of the labour movement in Spain